The 2012 Stockholm Ladies Cup was held from November 1 to 4 at the Danderdys Curling AB in Stockholm, Sweden as part of the 2012–13 World Curling Tour. The event was held in a triple knockout format, and the purse for the event was 120,000 SEK, of which the winner, Anette Norberg, received 42,000 SEK. Norberg, a former Stockholm Ladies Cup champion, defeated two-time runner-up Anna Hasselborg in the final, winning with a score of 5–4 in an extra end.

Teams
The teams are listed as follows:

Knockout results
The draw is listed as follows:

A event

B event

C event

Playoffs
The playoffs draw is listed as follows:

References

External links

Results on Cuponline.se

Stockholm Ladies Cup
2012 in Swedish sport
2012 in women's curling
2010s in Stockholm
November 2012 sports events in Europe